The McLintock Baronetcy, of Sanquhar in the County of Dumfries, is a title in the Baronetage of the United Kingdom. It was created on 19 January 1934 for the accountant William McLintock. He was a senior partner in the firm of Thomson McLintock & Company, chartered accountants.

McLintock baronets, of Sanquhar (1934)
Sir William McLintock, 1st Baronet, GBE (1873–1947)
Sir Thomson McLintock, 2nd Baronet (1905–1953)
Sir William Traven McLintock, 3rd Baronet (1931–1987)
Sir Michael William McLintock, 4th Baronet (born 1958)

References

Baronetcies in the Baronetage of the United Kingdom